Adarsh Polytechnic is a private, co-educational institution of higher learning located in the village of Brahmanwas in the Jind region of Haryana, India. The college was established on October 18, 2007, by Advance Education Society (AES).

History 
Advance Education Society was established in 2006 to educate rural students and is headed by Sh. Mahavir Sharma ji, president of the society. Adarsh Sr. Secondary School, Adarsh College of Education (for B.Ed.), Sanskar International School and Sanskar PG College for Women are also run by the society.

Recognition 
Adarsh Polytechnic is affiliated with the Haryana State Board of Technical Education (HSBTE), Panchkula and approved by All India Council of Technical Education, New Delhi (AICTE) and the Department of Technical Education, Govt. of Haryana (DTE).

Programs 
Adarsh Polytechnic offers diplomas in the following three-year engineering programs:

 DMLT—60+12
 Electronics and Communication Engineering – 60+12
 Electrical Engineering – 60+12
 Mechanical Engineering – 60+12
 Civil Engineering – 60+12

References

External links 
 
 Department of Technical Education, Haryana
 HSBTE RESULT

2007 establishments in Haryana
Technical schools
Educational institutions established in 2007